Steven Andrew Bonar (born 20 May 1979) is a Scottish former footballer, who played for Partick Thistle, Albion Rovers, Dumbarton, Forfar Athletic, Raith Rovers, Stranraer and Berwick Rangers

References

1979 births
Scottish footballers
Dumbarton F.C. players
Partick Thistle F.C. players
Albion Rovers F.C. players
Raith Rovers F.C. players
Berwick Rangers F.C. players
Stranraer F.C. players
Forfar Athletic F.C. players
Scottish Football League players
Living people
Association football midfielders